A scenery shop or scene shop is a specialized workshop found in many medium or large theaters, as well as many educational theatre settings. The primary function of a scene shop is to fabricate and assemble the flats, platforms, scenery wagons, and other scenic (set) pieces required for a performance. Commonly, a scene shop is also the location where most of the set painting is done, and is sometimes used to make props. Generally, the individuals who work in a scene shop are carpenters, although, in bigger shops, it is common for metalworkers to be employed for steel-construction set pieces which require welding and other machining.  It is common for the individuals working in a scene shop to be knowledgeable in a wide variety of technical skills, developed over time as required for specific construction needs.

Commercial shops
Commercial scene shops can also be found in larger metropolitan areas, where they are capable of supplying scenic elements to a variety of clients, including theatre, film, television, and corporate productions. Scenic studios also sometimes make elements for museum booths, touring concerts, and other custom fabrication tasks.

Shop construction
Although many scene shops are located in general purpose building, most are in purpose built spaces because scenic fabrication has some fairly specific needs. Often they are in very large, open rooms, to accommodate big elements that a show may call for. They are usually attached directly to a loading dock for delivery of materials and shipping of finished elements. If they are attached to a performance venue, it is also common to have large doors providing access to the stage. Typically, compressed air and dust collection systems are distributed around the shop. Many processes in a scene shop such as spray painting, welding, or hot-wire foam cutting produce dangerous gasses, so often extra ventilation is installed. Ideally, fume collection systems are available to use near the actual workpiece. Power is usually available in floor pockets or dropped from the ceiling, in a variety of voltages, as some tools, especially welders require high voltages. Often, scene shops have designated areas inside for paints, carpentry, metalwork, and sometimes prop construction. A scene shop will have many worker who are skilled to different craft work.

Common scenery shop tools 
Circular saws
Table saw
Power drills
Screwdrivers
Hammers
Miter saws
Welder
Cutoff grinder
Power sander
Showers

Parts of a theatre
Scenic design
Prop design